Seguenzia dabfari is a species of sea snail, a marine gastropod mollusk in the family Seguenziidae.

Description
The size of the shell varies between 2 mm and 3 mm.

Distribution
This marine species occurs off the Philippines.

References

External links
 

dabfari
Gastropods described in 2006